Kodial may refer to:

 Microhyla kodial, the Mangaluru narrow-mouthed frog

 Mangalore, known as Kodial in Konkani language